Accelerated Reader (AR) is a website used to assist students with reading skills.

Components

ATOS
ATOS is a readability formula designed by Renaissance Learning.

Books with quizzes in Accelerated Reader are assigned an ATOS readability level.

Quiz 
Accelerated (going up to 7th grade) Reader (AR) quizzes are available on fiction and non-fiction books, textbooks, supplemental materials, and magazines. Most are in the form of reading practice quizzes, although some are curriculum-based with multiple subjects.

Many of the company's quizzes are available in an optional recorded voice format for primary-level books, in which the quiz questions and answers are read to the student taking the quiz. These quizzes are designed to help emerging English and some Spanish readers take the quizzes without additional assistance.

The Renaissance Place version of Accelerated Reader also includes quizzes designed to practice vocabulary. The quizzes use words from books, and are taken after the book has been read. Bookmarks can be printed out that display the vocabulary words so that, as students read, they can refer to the bookmark for help. The quizzes keep track of words learned.

Reports
 Reports are generated on demand to help students, teachers, and parents monitor student progress. Reports are available regarding student reading, comprehension, amount of reading, diagnostic information, and other variables. Customizable reports available in the Renaissance Place edition can also report district-level information.

The TOPS Report (The Opportunity to Praise Students) reports quiz results after each quiz is taken. Diagnostic Reports identify students in need of intervention based on various factors. The Student Record Report is a complete record of the books the student has read.

Evaluation research 
A number of studies have been conducted regarding the effectiveness of using Accelerated Reader in the classroom. The following two studies were reviewed by the What Works Clearinghouse and were found to meet their high standards for research.

Ross, Nunnery, and Goldfeder studied 1,665 students and 76 teachers (grades K-8) from 12 schools in Memphis, Tennessee. Some teachers were randomly selected to use Accelerated Reader and the others continued the regular curriculum without using the software. Students in classrooms with Accelerated Reader demonstrated gains. Many of the teachers that used the software responded positively to it and indicated that they would continue to use the software. In another study, Nunnery, Ross, and McDonald assessed the reading achievement of students in grades 3–8. They assessed the effects of individual, classroom, and school factors that impact reading achievement. Those in Accelerated Reader classrooms still outperformed students in control classrooms. Students with learning disabilities in very high implementation classrooms did not suffer from their disabilities as much as similar students in low or no implementation classrooms.

Other evaluations
In a controlled evaluation, Holmes and Brown found that two schools using the School Renaissance program achieved statistically significant higher standardized test scores when compared with two comparison schools that only used the Renaissance program in a limited way. Because so many schools in the United States are using Accelerated Reader, it was difficult for the authors of this study to find two schools in Georgia that were not already using Accelerated Reader. The authors noted:

In 2003, Samuels and Wu found that, after six months, third- and fifth-grade students who used Accelerated Reader demonstrated twice the gain in reading comprehension as those that did not use Accelerated Reader. The comparison students completed book reports, suggesting that delayed feedback through book reports is not as useful as the immediate feedback provided by Accelerated Reader. In another study, Samuels and Wu found students in Accelerated Reader classrooms, after controlling for the amount of time spent reading each day, outperformed students in control classrooms.

Researcher Keith Topping completed a number of studies on Accelerated Reader that found the software to be an effective assessment for deciding curriculum.

Criticism

Educators, such as Cookie Muncie, have argued that the use of Accelerated Reader does not teach reading for comprehension; it only teaches reading for recall.A minimal number of Literacy Skill Quizzes in Accelerated Reader claim to assess higher order thinking skills. Eight Literacy Skill Quizzes have an ATOS level of 1.0-3.0, which provides limited support for higher order thinking skills for developing readers. Renaissance Place includes recognizing setting and understanding sequence as examples of higher order thinking.  Turner and Paris's study on the role of classroom literacy tasks is particularly relevant. Their vignettes describing open versus closed tasks may inform how we consider Accelerated Reader. In this program, students usually take end-of-book tests called Reading Practice Quizzes that are composed of literal-recall questions to which there is only one answer. Turner and Paris would classify these quizzes as "closed tasks.". Thus, they concluded that open-ended tasks are more supportive of literacy growth in the future. This research prompts some educators to refrain from using Accelerated Reader quizzes out of fear that students will begin to perceive the purpose of reading as answering literal-recall questions and possibly lose the desire to read.

Florida Center for Reading Research, citing two studies that support the product noted both the lack of available books in a school's library and the lack of assessment of "inferential or critical thinking skills" as weaknesses of the software. Their guide also noted a number of strengths of the software, including its ability to motivate students and provide immediate results on students' reading habits and progress.

Renaissance Learning, the product's developer, has stated that its intended purpose is to assess whether or not a student has read a book, not to assess higher order thinking skills, to teach or otherwise replace curriculum, to supersede the role of the teacher, or to provide extrinsic reward. The Literacy Skill Quizzes do attempt to assess higher-order thinking skills, even though this isn't intended purpose of the program. Jim Trelease describes Accelerated Reader, along with Scholastic's Reading Counts!, as "reading incentive software" in an article exploring the pros and cons of the two software packages. Stephen D. Krashen, in a 2003 literature review, asserts that reading incentives is one of the aspects of Accelerated Reader. In this review, Krashen reiterates prior research stating that reading for incentives does not create long-term readers. However, as noted above, Renaissance Learning does not promote the use of incentives, and the software can be used without incentives.

Use of the program has been criticized by Scholastic as preventing children from reading from a variety of difficulty levels. A PowerPoint from Scholastic, made in 2006, indicates that 39% of children between the ages of five and ten have read a Harry Potter novel, with 68% of students in that age range having an interest in reading or re-reading a Harry Potter book. For example, the ATOS reading level of Harry Potter and the Sorcerer's Stone is 5.5 (with ATOS numbers corresponding to grade levels). This would indicate that students below that grade range may not be able to read and comprehend the book. Since teachers, parents and student use readability levels to select books, this may discourage students from reading the book, as the student is under pressure to earn Accelerated Reader points during the school year, although students can take tests and earn points for books at any ATOS level.

References

External links
Accelerated Reader
ERIC - Education Resources Information Center
National Center on Student Progress Monitoring

Software for children
Renaissance Learning software
Children's educational video games